Tombstoning (or cliff jumping) is the act of jumping in a straight, upright vertical posture into the sea or other body of water from a high jumping platform, such as a cliff, bridge or harbour edge. This posture of the body, resembling a tombstone, gives the activity its name. A safety advisory from the Government of the United Kingdom records that tombstoning has been taking place for "generations". In the United Kingdom between 2005 and 2015 there were 83 people injured and 20 people who died whilst tombstoning.

Injuries and deaths
It was reported that "Between June and August [2007] there were nine drowning or near misses as a result of people jumping from height into the water. Five were fatal, and impact injuries such as neck and spinal injuries were common in those who survived."

In the UK between 2004 and 2008 there were 139 incidents of tombstoning where a rescue or emergency response was required. Spinal injuries occurred with 20% of these 139 incidents and 12 people died.

In the UK between 2005 and 2015 there were 83 people injured and 20 people who died whilst tombstoning.

For Lynn Canyon in Vancouver, it was reported in 2020 that "About 20 people have died in Lynn Canyon in the past 25 years, often in cliff-jumping incidents".

Hazards

Impact with water from height

When a person jumps from height and impacts with a water surface there is a greater risk of injury or death because of the greater forces involved; the resistance of the water is much higher due to the speed of entry. With the addition of horizontal velocity – i.e., a diver has a running start up to the point of jumping – the impact speed is higher than that of a jump of the same height from a immobile standing position. "[A] diver who gets a running start and develops a significant forward velocity will hit the water with more net speed than a diver who dives straight down without a push off."

Depth, tides and submerged objects

In relation to water depth, the water below a cliff when viewed from above may in actuality be shallower than it appears to be, with the potentially fast rise and fall of tides altering water depth as well; "what may have been a deep pool at lunchtime may be a shallow puddle by tea time."

Submerged objects also pose a direct risk to jumpers, who may sustain severe physical trauma upon colliding with them, or risk becoming entangled and unable to surface. "Objects like rocks, fishing gear, mooring lines and other under water hazards may not be visible."

Cold water shock and loss of breath

Cold water temperatures "can lead to cold water shock and can make even the most experienced swimmers unable to stay afloat." In 2019, tombstoners in the United Kingdom were warned that waters around the island stay cold even in warm weather, and that "when the body suddenly enters this environment it can cause an involuntary gasp resulting in water being breathed rather than air." When falling into water, having the wind "knocked out of you" could result in death by drowning.

Getting out of the water and strong currents

After a person has jumped from height into water, "it may be impossible to get out of the water", and "strong currents can rapidly sweep people away".

Safety measures 
The Maritime and Coastguard Agency released a safety document regarding tombstoning in conjunction with the Royal Society for the Prevention of Accidents. The national water safety forum published safety messages in relation to tombstoning.

The increasing number of injuries and deaths related to tombstoning has increased calls for responses from local authorities and emergency services. At Plymouth Hoe, in Plymouth, Devon, where tombstoning is popular, the number of serious injuries and deaths has led to the dismantling of seafront diving boards and closure of parts of the waterfront to discourage the activity. Similar practices are employed at Holcombe, Somerset, Herne Bay Pier in Kent, and in areas of Southampton's Redbridge causeway, all popular tombstoning locations.

Response

Criticism 
Conversely, Paul Snelling in the journal Public Health Ethics has argued that criticism of tombstoning has been based purely on a health perspective which "fails to take into account the enjoyment that various health effecting habits brings and the contribution that this makes to a good life." Residents of Portknockie in Moray defended tombstoning into the North Sea in July 2014 arguing that it was "a local tradition that dates back generations", pointing out that "the real dangers are when holidaymakers join in" who do not know when and where it is safe. Jo Wood of The Guardian also criticised the anti-tombstoning arguments in 2006, stating that "By banning tombstoning in and around the bays at Newquay, authorities are forcing the tombstoners to less populated and known cliffs, around unknown rip currents, increasing the danger of a) a bad jump and b) not being spotted and easily rescued should something go wrong."

See also 

 Coasteering
 Jumping platform
 Seatrekking

References

Sources

External links

Tombstoning
Diving (sport)